
Gmina Kowalewo Pomorskie is an urban-rural gmina (administrative district) in Golub-Dobrzyń County, Kuyavian-Pomeranian Voivodeship, in north-central Poland.

Villages
Apart from the town of Kowalewo Pomorskie, Gmina Kowalewo Pomorskie contains the villages and settlements of Bielsk, Borek, Borówno, Chełmonie, Chełmoniec, Dylewo, Elzanowo, Frydrychowo, Gapa, Józefat, Kiełpiny, Lipienica, Mariany, Martyniec, Mlewiec, Mlewo, Napole, Nowy Dwór, Otruda, Piątkowo, Pluskowęsy, Pruska Łąka, Sierakowo, Srebrniki, Srebrniki-Lądy, Szewa, Szychowo, Wielka Łąka, Wielkie Rychnowo and Zapluskowęsy.

Neighbouring gminas
Gmina Kowalewo Pomorskie is bordered by the gminas of Chełmża, Ciechocin, Dębowa Łąka, Golub-Dobrzyń, Lubicz, Łysomice and Wąbrzeźno.

References
Polish official population figures 2006

Kowalewo Pomorskie
Golub-Dobrzyń County